Buccinum oedematum, common name the swollen whelk, is a species of sea snail, a marine gastropod mollusk in the family Buccinidae, the true whelks.

Description
The length of an adult shell reaches 84 mm.

Distribution
This cold-water species occurs in the Gulf of Alaska. and in the Okhotsk Sea.

References

External links
 

Buccinidae
Gastropods described in 1907